Pakishe Aaron Motsoaledi  (born 7 August 1958, in Transvaal, now Limpopo) is the Minister of Home Affairs in the Cabinet of South Africa. He was previously the Minister of Health from 2009 to 2019. He was an MEC in Limpopo province for agriculture, environment,
and education.

Biography
Motsoaledi was born in Phokwane village in Limpopo Province to Kgokolo Michael Motsoaledi and Sina Sekeku Maile. He was one of nine children (seven boys and two girls) in the family. As a child at the age of 8, he gained political awareness after witnessing the arrest of a neighbour for not carrying a "dompas" (reference book) and was later heavily influenced by the 1976 Soweto uprising. He received secondary education at Setotolwane High School. While attending the University of the North at Turfloop, he was frequently involved in student marches, demonstrations and sit-ins at the campus and Mankweng police station.

Motsoaledi is a medical doctor by training. He holds a Bachelor of Medicine and Surgery from the University of Natal while attending there in the late 1970s. He was elected to the student representative council in 1980, and participated in the formation of a student movement, the Azanian Students’ Organisation (AZASO), which he was elected the national correspondence secretary. Motsoaledi ran a successful surgery in the small rural town of Jane Furse prior to his appointment in government. He also help mobilising students in Natal for the formation of the United Democratic Front (UDF) and have connections with the ANC's armed wing, Umkhonto we Sizwe (MK) in Sekhukhuneland.

Prior to his appointment as Minister of Health of the Republic of South Africa, Motsoaledi had served as a Chairperson of the Sekhukhune Advice Office from 1986 to 1994; as a Chairperson of Hlahlolanang Health and Nutrition Education Project in 1989; as a Deputy Chairperson of the African National Congress (ANC) in the then Northern Transvaal from 1991 to 1992; as Head of the ANC Elections Commission for Limpopo Province in 1994; as Head of the ANC Economic and Infrastructure Desk and as Head of the ANC Research and Briefing of election Task Team in Limpopo in 1994.

Motsoaledi has also served as a member of the Limpopo Provincial Legislature from 1994 to 2009; as a member of the Limpopo Provincial Executive Council (MEC) for Education from 1994 to 1997; MEC for Transport from 1998 to 1999 and MEC for Agriculture, Land and Environment in 1999.

The Minister administered to the first South African state patient a fixed dose combination (FDC) antiretroviral tablet of Efavirenz/emtricitabine/tenofovir on 9 April 2013 in GaRankuwa.

In November 2016, 32 ANC MPs stayed away from the motion of no confidence, including Motsoaledi, who had recently spoken out against Zuma and did not vote either.

In May 2019, Motsoaledi was named Minister of Home Affairs by President Cyril Ramaphosa.

Controversy 
In November, 2019 several months after being appointed Minister for Home Affairs he was named alongside Ace Magashule in a 5 million bribery and murder investigation in a high court in Bloemfontein, Free State. During the case, Motsoaledi claimed he neither had knowledge or spoke to the suspects.

Other activities
 UNAIDS–Lancet Commission on Defeating AIDS, Member (2013-2015)

References

1958 births
Living people
People from Limpopo
Northern Sotho people
African National Congress politicians
Health ministers of South Africa
Members of the National Assembly of South Africa
Provincial political office-holders in South Africa
Members of the Limpopo Provincial Legislature